Geophis cancellatus, also known as the Chiapas earth snake, is a snake of the colubrid family. It is endemic to Mexico.

References

Geophis
Snakes of North America
Endemic reptiles of Mexico
Taxa named by Hobart Muir Smith
Reptiles described in 1941